Sir Claudius Forster, 1st Baronet (c. 1575 – c. 1623) was a member of an ancient and influential Northumbrian family. He was descended from a long line of Governors of Bamburgh Castle, and was granted ownership of Bamburgh Castle and estates by the Crown in 1609.

He was knighted by James I in 1603 and created a Baronet in the Baronetage of England on 7 March 1620.

He was the son of Nicholas Forster ( High Sheriff of Northumberland in 1602) and Jane Radclyffe of Blanchland and inherited the Blanchland Abbey estate from his mother.

Forster followed his father as High Sheriff of Northumberland in 1612.

He married Elizabeth Fenwick but they had no children and the estates passed to his brother John.

His memorial is in St Aidan's Church, Bamburgh.

References

 History and Antiquities of North Durham (1852) Rev James Raine MA, Page 306
 

Baronets in the Baronetage of England
1570s births
1623 deaths
People from Bamburgh
17th-century English nobility
High Sheriffs of Northumberland